Giuseppe Colosi (29 March 1892 – 20 October 1975) was an Italian zoologist. He specialized in the study of crustaceans and mysids in particular.

Colosi was born in Petralia Sottana. From 1920 to 1924, he taught in Turin, and he was the head of the zoological institute of the University of Florence from 1940 to 1962. He died in Florence, aged 83.

Colosi is commemorated in the scientific name of a species of lizard, Chalcides colosii.

See also
 Ethology Ecology & Evolution

References

External links
Web page at the University of Florence.

Further reading
Pardi L (1977). "Giuseppe Colosi. Discorso commemorativo..." Accademia dei Lincei. (in Italian).

1892 births
1975 deaths
People from Petralia Sottana
20th-century Italian zoologists
Italian carcinologists
Academic staff of the University of Florence